Egon Weiner (1906 – August 1, 1987) was a Chicago sculptor and longtime professor (1945–1971) at the Art Institute of Chicago. He was known for a  abstract bronze sculpture, Pillar of Fire, which can be found on the grounds of the Chicago Fire Academy on the spot where, legend has it, Mrs. O'Leary's cow knocked over the lantern that started the Great Chicago Fire of 1871.

Significant works
Frank Lloyd Wright Monument at the entrance of Austin Gardens, Oak Park, Illinois.

Books by Weiner
 Art and Human Emotions. Springfield, IL: Thomas, 1974.

Sources
 Obituary: "Egon Weiner, 81, sculptor, created 'Pillar of Fire'" (Chicago Sun-Times August 1, 1987, by Leslie Baldacci).

Newspaper coverage
 Numerous articles on Weiner, spanning several decades, can be found at Google News.

1906 births
1987 deaths
20th-century American sculptors
Jewish artists
20th-century American male artists
American male sculptors